Lisa Ayu Kusumawati (born 15 January 2000) is an Indonesian badminton player affiliated with Djarum club.

Career 
Kusumawati was born in Sleman, Yogyakarta, and joining Djarum club in 2012. She has won four U17 National circuit titles. She won her first international title at the 2019 Finnish Open in the mixed doubles event partnered with Rehan Naufal Kusharjanto.

2022 
In March, Kusumawati and Rehan Naufal Kusharjanto reached their first BWF Tour final in the Orléans Masters but lost to Singaporean pair of Terry Hee and Tan Wei Han. In October, they reached another final in the Vietnam Open but lost to fellow Indonesian pair of Dejan Ferdinansyah and Gloria Emanuelle Widjaja. In November 2022, they claimed their first ever BWF World Tour title in the Hylo Open by defeating Feng Yanzhe and Huang Dongping in the final in straight games.

2023 
Kusumawati and Kusharjanto opened the 2023 season at the Malaysia Open, but defeated in the second round to Malaysian pair Chen Tang Jie and Toh Ee Wei. In the next tournament, they lost again in second round of the India Open from top seed Zheng Siwei and Huang Yaqiong of China. They competed at the home tournament, Indonesia Masters, but had to lose in the first round from Japanese pair Kyohei Yamashita and Naru Shinoya. For the fourth consecutive time, they lost early in the second round of the Thailand Masters, this time from Korean pair Kim Won-ho and Jeong Na-eun.

In February, Kusumawati join the Indonesia national badminton team to compete at the Badminton Asia Mixed Team Championships, but unfortunately the teams lost in the quarter-finals from team Korea.

Achievements

BWF World Tour (1 title, 2 runners-up)
The BWF World Tour, which was announced on 19 March 2017 and implemented in 2018, is a series of elite badminton tournaments sanctioned by the Badminton World Federation (BWF). The BWF World Tours are divided into levels of World Tour Finals, Super 1000, Super 750, Super 500, Super 300, and the BWF Tour Super 100.

Mixed doubles

BWF International Challenge/Series (1 title) 
Mixed doubles

  BWF International Challenge tournament
  BWF International Series tournament

BWF Junior International (1 title) 
Mixed doubles

  BWF Junior International Grand Prix tournament
  BWF Junior International Challenge tournament
  BWF Junior International Series tournament
  BWF Junior Future Series tournament

Performance timeline

National team 
 Junior level

 Senior level

Individual competitions

Junior level  
 Girls' doubles

 Mixed doubles

Senior level

Women's doubles

Mixed doubles

References

External links 
 

2000 births
Living people
People from Sleman Regency
Sportspeople from Special Region of Yogyakarta
Indonesian female badminton players
21st-century Indonesian women